"Execution" is episode 26 of the American television anthology series The Twilight Zone. It features Albert Salmi, who also plays the lead character in the Season 4 episode "Of Late I Think of Cliffordville".

Opening narration

Plot
In 1880, an outlaw cowboy named Joe Caswell is about to be hanged for murder. But as the noose tightens around his neck, he suddenly disappears and finds himself in 1960, in the laboratory of Professor Manion. Manion explains that he used a time machine to pluck Caswell from the past. But when Manion sees Caswell's rope burns around his neck, and hears his admission that in his life he had murdered over 20 men, he knows he must try to send Caswell back.

The discussion leads to an argument. Caswell attacks Manion, killing him with a desk lamp. He then flees from the laboratory into a busy street, but is overwhelmed by the lights and the noise; he returns to the lab, distraught and desperate. He breaks down, pleading for the dead scientist to help him.

A thief named Paul Johnson enters the lab. Caswell fights with Johnson, but Johnson gets the upper hand and strangles Caswell with the cord from the window curtains. As Johnson tries to find Manion's safe, he accidentally activates the time machine and is sent back to 1880, appearing in the noose intended for Caswell, just in time to be hanged. The witnesses to the hanging are shocked to see a stranger's body, in strange clothes, in place of Caswell. They question whether this was the Devil's work or some other power's, and whether they have just executed an innocent man.

Closing narration

Further reading
DeVoe, Bill. (2008). Trivia from The Twilight Zone. Albany, GA: Bear Manor Media. 
Grabman, Sandra. (2005). Spotlights and Shadows: The Albert Salmi Story. Albany, GA: Bear Manor Media.
Grams, Martin. (2008). The Twilight Zone: Unlocking the Door to a Television Classic. Churchville, MD: OTR Publishing.

External links
 

1960 American television episodes
The Twilight Zone (1959 TV series season 1) episodes
Television episodes about death
Television episodes about time travel
Television episodes written by Rod Serling
Fiction set in 1880
Fiction set in 1960
Television episodes written by George Clayton Johnson